Richard Pootmans is a Canadian politician who currently serves as the councillor for Ward 6 on the Calgary City Council. Pootmans initially served two terms from 2010 to 2017 before a one-term hiatus during which he co-founded a consultancy. He returned to council following the 2021 municipal election.

Early life 
Richard Pootmans was born in 1956.

Education 
Lisgar Collegiate (Ottawa)  Class of 1974

Carleton University (Ottawa) Class of 1979

Mount Royal University (Petroleum Land Management) Class of 1979

University of Calgary (MBA) 1996

Awards 
Pootmans was the 2009 recipient of the Economic Development Alberta Economic Developer of the Year.

Career before politics 
Prior to being elected in 2010, Pootmans taught as an instructor for 5 years at the Haskayne School of Business at the University of Calgary. He was Senior Business Development Manager, Real Estate – Calgary Economic Development, Financial Analyst; Vice President, Installations – SMED International, Consultant; Financial management, business strategy – TractionWorks, Co-owner – PORTS International stores, Calgary, and worked as a Landman – Hudson's Bay Oil and Gas Company, Dome Petroleum.

Electoral record

2010 municipal election 
Pootmans was first elected to serve Ward 6 in the 2010 election, taking 31% of the votes in a field of 10 candidates.

2013 municipal election 
Pootmans was reelected in the 2013 election by capturing 51% of the votes.

2021 municipal election 
After a four-year hiatus from politics, Pootmans sought election in Ward 6 during the 2021 municipal election. His successor, Jeff Davison, did not run for council, instead seeking the mayoralty. Pootmans won with 48% of the vote on October 18.

References

External links 
 Ward 6 Fall 2021 Candidate site

 City of Calgary Ward 6 homepage

Living people
Calgary city councillors
Date of birth missing (living people)
University of Calgary alumni
Academic staff of the University of Calgary
Mount Royal University alumni
Carleton University alumni
Year of birth missing (living people)